Pavel Jenyš (born 2 April 1996) is a Czech professional ice hockey forward currently playing for HC RT Torax Poruba in the Chance liga. 

Jenyš was selected by the Minnesota Wild in the seventh round (199th overall) at the 2014 NHL Entry Draft.

Playing career
Jenyš made his Czech Extraliga debut playing with HC Kometa Brno debut during the 2013–14 season. After his selection by the Minnesota Wild in the 2014 NHL Entry Draft, Jenyš moved to North America and played a season of junior hockey with the Sudbury Wolves of the Ontario Hockey League (OHL).

On 5 May 2015, Jenyš was signed to a three-year, entry-level contract with the Wild. On 21 November 2018, Jenyš was traded to the Los Angeles Kings in exchange for Stepan Falkovsky.

With his entry-level contract completed and as an impending free agent from the Kings, Jenyš opted to return to the Czech Republic, agreeing to a one-year contract with original club, HC Kometa Brno, on 5 June 2019.

Career statistics

Regular season and playoffs

International

References

External links
 

1996 births
Living people
Allen Americans players
Czech ice hockey forwards
Iowa Wild players
HC Kometa Brno players
Manchester Monarchs (ECHL) players
Minnesota Wild draft picks
Niagara IceDogs players
Ontario Reign (AHL) players
Quad City Mallards (ECHL) players
Rapid City Rush players
Sudbury Wolves players
SK Horácká Slavia Třebíč players
HC Dynamo Pardubice players
HC Košice players
Ice hockey people from Brno
Czech expatriate ice hockey players in Canada
Czech expatriate ice hockey players in Slovakia
Czech expatriate ice hockey players in the United States